Coleophora caradjai is a moth of the family Coleophoridae. It is found in Shandong in eastern China.

The wingspan is about 14 mm.

References

caradjai
Moths described in 1989
Moths of Asia